Kyloe is a civil parish in the county of Northumberland, about  south-east of Berwick-upon-Tweed. According to the parish council, the main centres of population are Fenwick, Beal, and Berrington (in the western "panhandle" of the parish).

The grade-II-listed former Church of St Nicholas in Kyloe was built in the 18th century, replacing a medieval building, and is now a private house.

At East Kyloe, the ruins of a late 14th- or early 15th-century medieval tower house known as Kyloe Tower now form part of a complex of farm buildings.

The nearby woodland area is a famous area for rock climbing and bouldering. Known locally as 'Kyloe-In-The-Woods' or simply 'The Woods', the crags are home to some of the toughest climbs in the UK.

Notable people 
William Wilson Allen, VC (Rorke's Drift) was born at Kyloe in 1843

References

External links 
GENUKI (Accessed: 20 November 2008)

Civil parishes in Northumberland